Budhla Sant is a town located to the east of Multan, in southern Punjab, Pakistan. At 
30.1538° N, 71.7118° E .

Budhla Sant is located in suburb of Multan, Khanewal, and Jahanian at a distance: 19, 30, and 10 respectively. Postcode of Budhla Sant is 59021.

History
Budhla Sant has inherited such a diverse character from its historical footprints: a sign of which is Talab (Pond) in the center of the city, built by Raja Dahir. Before the partition it had a religious importance for Hindues who celebrate a festival on 15 March every year at Talab( pound).

References 
http://budhlasant.com/about/

External links

Populated places in Multan District